The Samsung Galaxy J3 (2018) (also known as Galaxy J3 Star, Galaxy J3 Aura, Galaxy J3 V (2018) and Galaxy Amp Prime 3) is an Android smartphone manufactured by Samsung Electronics and was released on June 8, 2018.

Specifications

Hardware 
The Galaxy J3 (2018) is powered by an Exynos 7570 SoC including a quad-core 1.4 GHz ARM Cortex-A53 CPU, an ARM Mali-T720MP2 GPU with 2 GB RAM and 16 GB of internal storage which can be upgraded up to 400 GB via microSD card.

It has a 5.62-inch LCD display with a 720p resolution. The 8 MP rear camera features f/1.9 aperture, autofocus, LED flash, HDR and Full HD video. The front camera has 5 MP with f/2.2 aperture.

Software 
The Galaxy J3 (2018) is shipped with Android 8.0.0 "Oreo" and Samsung's Experience user interface. Verizon branded J3 (2018) and J3 V (2018) can be upgraded to 9 "Pie" and One UI.

See also 

 Samsung Galaxy
 Samsung Galaxy J series
 Samsung Galaxy J2 Core
 Samsung Galaxy J4 Core
 Samsung Galaxy J6
 Samsung Galaxy J series
 Samsung Galaxy J4+
 Samsung Galaxy J6+
 Samsung Galaxy J8

References

External links 

Samsung Galaxy
Samsung smartphones
Android (operating system) devices
Mobile phones introduced in 2018
Discontinued smartphones
Mobile phones with user-replaceable battery